Hits Radio Bournemouth & Poole is an Independent Local radio station owned and operated by Bauer as part of the Hits Radio Network. The station broadcast to Bournemouth, Poole, and Christchurch, Dorset, based in Segensworth in Fareham

The station was originally launched on 26 June 1999 by founding Directors James Bromley and David Harber as FM 107.6 The NRG, but changed name a year later following a dispute with French radio station NRJ.  The station is now owned and operated by Bauer Radio

As of December 2022, the station broadcasts to a weekly audience of 20,000, according to RAJAR.

History
 
The NRG (Nerve Radio Group) was born out of the Bournemouth student station Nerve* Radio. The launch team included David and Emily at Breakfast, Max Hailey, James "Lloydie" Lloyd and Dan Lodge on the schedule. A range of specialist DJs were included in the schedule, such as Jay Ratchett, Ross EB, Jon Langford, Michael Artwell and Jez Welham. Specialist programmes also included Club Versive hosted by Boy George, and the Ministry of Sound Dance Party.

Name change
French broadcaster NRJ challenged "The NRG" over the use of the name as the pronunciation was the same. In discussion with the station's solicitors (Stephens Innocent) the station management agreed that although there was a "chance" that the Bournemouth station could win the challenge – and even if not, they could go to Appeal and "almost certainly" win – the costs involved in challenging one of Europe's biggest radio brands would be too high for a small station on the South Coast of the UK. Despite the notion of 'borrowing station names', Managing Director David Harber renamed the station "The Fire" after a Chicago-based station "WFYR" which had been 'off-air' for a number of years. The station changed name on Bonfire Night, 2000.

Studios

The station moved from the original studios in the Quadrant Shopping Centre, to purpose-built studios at the Picture House on Holdenhurst Road in Bournemouth in June 2007. The station now broadcasts from the Celador studios in Southampton.

Ownership

The station was sold by its original founders in October 2001 to Radio Investments Limited, which later became known as The Local Radio Company.

The Local Radio Company then sold Fire 107.6 to Westward Broadcasting in June 2009.

Celador Radio purchased Fire in July 2014. In February 2019, Fire was then sold to Bauer Radio

Hits Radio Bournemouth and Poole

On 6 September 2021, Fire Radio was renamed Hits Radio Bournemouth and Poole with Fleur East at Breakfast and Jono Holmes on drivetime. Max and Jason moved to drivetime on Hits Radio Bristol and the South West launching on the same day.

Programming 
Networked programming originates from Bauer's Manchester studios.

Local programming is produced and broadcast from 4pm - 7pm weekdays.

News 
Bauer's Segensworth newsroom broadcasts local news bulletins hourly from 6am-7pm on weekdays, and from 7am-1pm on Saturdays and Sundays. Headlines are broadcast on the half-hour during weekday breakfast and drivetime shows, alongside traffic bulletins.

National bulletins from Sky News Radio are carried overnight with bespoke networked bulletins on weekend afternoons, usually originating from Bauer's Manchester newsroom.

Transmitters

Analogue (FM)

Digital (DAB)

Slogans
 'Today's Music'
 'Bournemouth, Poole and Christchurch'
 'Playing the very best Non-Stop 90s and now'
 'Set your Radio on FIRE'
 'You're on FIRE'
 'Love the new FIRE 107.6'
 'Only FIRE news is all local, all day'
 'The hit music station for Bournemouth, Poole and Christchurch'
 'The Most Hit Music'
 'This is FIRE Radio'
 'Bigger variety of hits'
 'The Biggest Hits, The Biggest Throwbacks'
'Hits Radio is Coming to Bournemouth and Poole, New Name For Fire, Playing The Biggest Hits and The Biggest Throwbacks'

References

External links
 Fire Radio
 Media UK station profile
 West Howe transmitter Site

Hits Radio
Radio stations in Dorset
Companies based in Bournemouth
Bournemouth
Radio stations established in 1999
1999 establishments in England